The Junior men's race at the 1997 IAAF World Cross Country Championships was held in Torino, Italy, at the Parco del Valentino on March 23, 1997.   A report on the event was given in The New York Times, in the Herald, and for the IAAF.

Complete results, medallists, and the results of British athletes were published.

Race results

Junior men's race (8.511 km)

Individual

Teams

Note: Athletes in parentheses did not score for the team result

Participation
An unofficial count yields the participation of 160 athletes from 48 countries in the Junior men's race.  This is in agreement with the official numbers as published.

 (6)
 (1)
 (3)
 (4)
 (4)
 (3)
 (1)
 (4)
 (6)
 (1)
 (4)
 (1)
 (6)
 (4)
 (6)
 (4)
 (4)
 (1)
 (1)
 (6)
 (6)
 (1)
 (6)
 (4)
 (1)
 (1)
 (4)
 (4)
 (6)
 (3)
 (1)
 (3)
 (1)
 (1)
 (1)
 (1)
 (1)
 (1)
 (6)
 (6)
 (5)
 (1)
 (4)
 (4)
 (6)
 (6)
 (5)
 (1)

See also
 1997 IAAF World Cross Country Championships – Senior men's race
 1997 IAAF World Cross Country Championships – Senior women's race
 1997 IAAF World Cross Country Championships – Junior women's race

References

Junior men's race at the World Athletics Cross Country Championships
1997 in youth sport
IAAF